Dawhan Fran Urano da Purificação Oliveira (born 3 June 1996), simply known as Dawhan, is a Brazilian footballer who plays as a defensive midfielder or a centre back for Japanese club Gamba Osaka, on loan from Santa Rita.

Club career
Born in Aracaju, Sergipe, Dawhan represented Vitória, Internacional and Corinthians as a youth, before making his senior debut while on loan at Corinthians' partner club Flamengo-SP in 2015. He subsequently returned to Timãos under-20 squad after the 2015 Campeonato Paulista Série A3, but left the club in the end of 2016 as his contract expired; he subsequently agreed to a deal with CSA.

Dawhan featured regularly for CSA during the following seasons, achieving two consecutive promotions and reaching the Série A, aside from winning the 2017 Série C and two Campeonato Alagoano titles in a row. He made his top tier debut on 28 April 2019, starting in a 0–4 away loss against Ceará.

After suffering relegation, Dawhan agreed to a contract with Ponte Preta for the 2020 season. On 20 July 2021, he returned to the top tier after signing for Juventude.

Career statistics

References

External links

1996 births
Living people
People from Aracaju
Brazilian footballers
Association football midfielders
Campeonato Brasileiro Série A players
Campeonato Brasileiro Série B players
Campeonato Brasileiro Série C players
Sport Club Corinthians Paulista players
Associação Atlética Flamengo players
Centro Sportivo Alagoano players
Associação Atlética Ponte Preta players
Esporte Clube Juventude players
Gamba Osaka players
Brazilian expatriate footballers
Brazilian expatriate sportspeople in Japan
Expatriate footballers in Japan
Sportspeople from Sergipe